William McKinley "Max" Venable (born June 6, 1957) is an American former professional baseball outfielder and designated hitter. He played 12 seasons in Major League Baseball (MLB) for the San Francisco Giants, Montreal Expos, Cincinnati Reds, and California Angels. Venable also played for the Chiba Lotte Marines of Nippon Professional Baseball (NPB), and coached for the SK Wyverns of the KBO League.

Early years 
Venable went to Cordova High School in Rancho Cordova, California, where he was a multi-sport star. He excelled in all sports but, in high school, football was his best. He turned down football scholarships to sign with the Los Angeles Dodgers.

Career

Major League Baseball 
He played for the San Francisco Giants, Montreal Expos, and Cincinnati Reds, all of the National League, and the California Angels of the American League.

He coached for the Atlanta Braves in the minor leagues, along with the San Diego Padres. He is a hitting instructor in the Seattle Mariners farm system to date.

SK Wyverns 
Max signed with Korean Baseball team SK Wyverns as a hitting coach in 2013.

Personal life 
Max's older son, Will, is a former Major League outfielder and he previously played baseball and basketball for Princeton University. Max's younger son Winston Venable was a standout safety for the Boise State Broncos football team for the 2009–10 and 2010–11 seasons.

References

External links 

, or Retrosheet, or Pura Pelota

1957 births
Living people
African-American baseball coaches
African-American baseball managers
African-American baseball players
American expatriate baseball people in South Korea
American expatriate baseball players in Canada
American expatriate baseball players in Japan
American expatriate baseball players in Mexico
Baseball coaches from Arizona
Baseball coaches from California
Baseball players from Arizona
Baseball players from California
Bellingham Dodgers players
California Angels players
Chiba Lotte Marines players
Cincinnati Reds players
Clinton Dodgers players
Denver Zephyrs players
Edmonton Trappers players
Indianapolis Indians players
Leones de Yucatán players
Lodi Dodgers players
Major League Baseball outfielders
Minor league baseball managers
Montreal Expos players
Nashville Sounds players
Nippon Professional Baseball outfielders
People from Rancho Cordova, California
Phoenix Giants players
San Francisco Giants players
Shreveport Captains players
SSG Landers coaches
Tigres de Aragua players
American expatriate baseball players in Venezuela
21st-century African-American people
20th-century African-American sportspeople